Cobitis stephanidisi is a species of ray-finned fish in the family Cobitidae.
It is found only in Greece.
Its natural habitat is freshwater springs.
It is threatened by habitat loss.

References

Sources

Cobitis
Freshwater fish of Europe
Fish described in 1992
Taxonomy articles created by Polbot